"It's Your Move" is a song by Doug Parkinson, released in March 1983 on the album Heartbeat to Heartbeat.

America version

A few months after the song's initial release, it was released by the band America, retitled "Your Move", from their album of the same name.

Diana Ross version

In 1984, Diana Ross covered the song. It appeares on the album Swept Away.
This version was later sampled in the 2011 vaporwave song "リサフランク420 / 現代のコンピュー" ("Lisa Frank 420 / Modern Computing") by Macintosh Plus, where it was slowed down and chopped and screwed, with the pitch changed. It became an Internet meme worldwide.

References

1983 songs
1983 singles
America (band) songs
Diana Ross songs
Internet memes